W.A.K.O. World Championships 2003 in Paris were the joint fourteenth world championships held by the W.A.K.O. and the first ever to be held in France.  The other (joint) world championships were to be held in November of the same year in Yalta, Ukraine.  The event was open to amateur men and women with approximately 780 athletes from 63 countries across the world taking part.

There were four styles on offer at Paris; Full-Contact, Light-Contact, Semi-Contact and Aero-Kickboxing.  The other W.A.K.O. styles (Low-Kick, Thai-Boxing and Musical Forms) would be held at the second event later in the year at Yalta.  By the end of the championships, Russia was the strongest nation in terms of medals won, with Hungary in second and Italy in third.  The event was held between five days at the Palais des Sports Marcel-Cerdan in Paris, France, starting on Tuesday, October 21 and finishing on Sunday, October 26, 2003.

Full-Contact

Full-Contact is a form of kickboxing where strikes above the waist are allowed to be thrown at full force, with wins usually occurring either via knockout or by a point's decision.  As with most other forms of amateur kickboxing all contestants must wear head and body protection.  More information on the rules can be found at the official W.A.K.O. website.  At Paris the men had twelve weight divisions ranging from 51 kg/112.2 lbs to over 91 kg/+200.2 lbs, while the women had seven ranging from 48 kg/105.6 lbs to over 70 kg/+143 lbs.  Notable winners included a young Muamer Hukić (more commonly known as the cruiserweight boxing champion Marco Huck) who added to the gold he won at the last European championships, and Ruslan Karaev who would have a number of fights (and win several titles) with the K-1 organization.  Other notable winners included Fouad Habbani who won his third straight gold medal in Full-Contact at a W.A.K.O. championships, while Olesya Gladkova, Oksana Vasilieva  and Oksana Vasilieva had all won gold medals at the last Europeans.  By the end of the championships, Russia was by far the strongest nation in the style, winning nine golds, four silvers and two bronze.

Men's Full-Contact Kickboxing Medals Table

Women's Full-Contact Kickboxing Medals Table

Light-Contact

Light-Contact is a form of kickboxing that is less physical than Full-Contact but more so than Semi-Contact and is often seen as a transition between the two.  Contestants score points on the basis of speed and technique over brute force although stoppages can occur, although as with other amateur forms head and body protection must be worn - more detail on Light-Contact rules can be found on the official W.A.K.O. website.  The men had nine weight divisions ranging from 57 kg/125.4 lbs to over 94 kg/+206.8 lbs while the women had six ranging from 50 kg/110 lbs to over 70 kg/154 lbs.  Though not full of household names there were several previous winners with Dezső Debreczeni, Zoltan Dancso, Szilvia Csicsely and Nadja Sibila having picked up golds at previous events.  By the end of the championships Hungary were the strongest nation in the style, winning four gold, two silver and two bronze medals.

Men's Light-Contact Kickboxing Medals Table

Women's Light-Contact Kickboxing Medals Table

Semi-Contact

Aero-Kickboxing

Aero Kickboxing is a non physical competition, involving participants using a mixture of aerobic and kickboxing techniques in time to specifically selected music.  There are no weight divisions like in other forms of kickboxing in W.A.K.O. but there are separate male, female and team categories, with additional events being introduced in Paris, with a male and female 'with (aerobic) step' and 'without (aerobic) step' being added.  Also, unlike the contact categories, an individual country was allowed more than one competitor, with the team event even having several teams from the same country.  More information on Aero-Kickboxing and the rules can be found on the W.A.K.O. website.  Although the Aero-Kickboxing competitions in Paris were not well documented with many of the winners being absent from records, Italy did particularly well, winning three gold and two silver medal.

Aero Kickboxing (Men) Medals Table

Aero Kickboxing (Women) Medals Table

Aero-Kickboxing (Team) Medals Table

Overall Medals Standing (Top 5)

See also
List of WAKO Amateur World Championships
List of WAKO Amateur European Championships

References

External links
 WAKO World Association of Kickboxing Organizations Official Site

WAKO Amateur World Championships events
Kickboxing in France
2003 in kickboxing
Wako